Summer Fields is a fee-paying boys' independent day and boarding preparatory school in Summertown, Oxford.  It was originally called  Summerfield and used to have a subsidiary school, Summerfields, St Leonards-on-Sea (known as "Summers mi").

History
Summerfield became a boys' preparatory school in 1864, with seven pupils. Its owner, Archibald MacLaren, had been educated at Dollar Academy and was a fencing teacher who ran a gymnasium in Oxford. He believed strongly in the importance of physical fitness. His wife, Gertrude, was a classical scholar and teacher, a daughter of David Alphonso Talboys. The school motto is Mens sana in corpore sano, "A healthy mind in a healthy body".

The school grew and needed more staff, two of whom married into the Maclaren family: the Reverend Dr Charles Williams ("Doctor"), who took over the scholarship form from Mrs Maclaren and married Mabel Maclaren in 1879, and the Reverend Hugh Alington, who married Margaret Maclaren in 1885 and took over the boys' games. The school remained in the hands of the Maclaren, Williams, and Alington families for its first 75 years.

At the end of the 19th century, "Doctor" became headmaster and there was much building at the school. A second school, "Summers mi", was opened at St Leonards-on-Sea, Sussex, for boys to benefit from the sea air. In 1918 Doctor passed the headmastership on to Hugh Alington. There was a lean spell in the 1930s, and numbers fell, but John Evans and Geoffrey Bolton ("G.B.") took over in 1939. During the Second World War three other schools were evacuated to Summer Fields – Famborough School, Hampshire, Summers mi, and St Cyprian's School from Eastbourne – and this restored the numbers.

In 1955, the school became a charitable trust, with a board of governors, including Harold Macmillan, who had been at the school as a boy and was soon to become Prime Minister.

During the 1960s, Pat Savage was headmaster, with the assistance of Jimmy Bell and Pat Marston. By the centenary year in 1964, the school's appearance had changed relatively little (see illustration), but it was thriving and energetic enough to celebrate with a hardback book of 332 pages, with contributions from "O.S.", or Old Summerfieldians, including stories about Archibald Wavell, 1st Earl Wavell, and Harold Macmillan, and a friendly greeting in verse from the arch-rival Horris Hill School. A former pupil recollected Pat Marston as follows:

However, another former pupil described a culture of brutality at the school, epitomised by 'the Ogre': "Any honest account would have described Pat Marston as a brutal sadist. 'Bend over the arm of that sofa and pull down your pyjama trousers, boy. And then the beating would begin ... The result was a web of welts and cuts that descended as far as the back of your knees, or even lower."

In 1975, Nigel Talbot Rice took over as headmaster. He put the school on a sound financial footing through a series of appeals which paid for an ambitious building programme: new classrooms, the Macmillan Hall and Music Centre, an indoor swimming-pool, the Wavell Arts and Technology Centre (named after Earl Wavell), and the Sports Hall. In 1997, Talbot Rice retired and was succeeded by Robin Badham-Thornhill. In 2010 David Faber, an old boy and governor, took over as headmaster.

In 2002 a new lodge called "Savage's" was built. Later a new year group was added at the bottom of the school.

Summer Fields today

The boys are organised into four "leagues". One of them is named Maclaren, after the Founder; the others are Moseley, after Henry Moseley, Congreve, after William La Touche Congreve, and Case, after William Sterndale Case, a master from 1910 to 1922. Each league has its own identifying colour: Case red, Congreve yellow, Maclaren green, and Moseley blue. In leagues, the boys wear a polo shirt in the league colour, along with the rest of the uniform, blue corduroys, and black shoes. On Sundays as well as on special days, such as the school concert, and the end of term, boys wear a tweed jacket, with a light blue coloured shirt, black shoes, and grey flannel trousers. Their ties are in their league colours.

The school has traditionally been a rival of the Dragon School, which is also in north Oxford.

Notable Old Summerfieldians
See also :Category:People educated at Summer Fields School

 Gubby Allen (1902–1989), cricketer
 Julian Amery (1919–1996), politician
 Ralph Assheton, 1st Baron Clitheroe (1901–1984), politician
 Anthony Asquith (1902–1968), film director
 Cyril Asquith, Baron Asquith of Bishopstone (1890–1954), judge
 Cuthbert Bardsley (1907–1991), bishop
 Tom Parker Bowles (1974– ), writer 
 Harold Caccia, Baron Caccia (1905–1990), diplomat
 Sir Olaf Caroe (1892–1981), colonial administrator
 Mark Colvin (1952–2017), broadcaster and journalist
 William La Touche Congreve VC, DSO, MC (1891–1916)

 Hugh Dalton, (1887–1962), politician
 Robin Durnford-Slater (1902–1984), admiral
 David Faber (1961– ), politician, schoolmaster
 Hugh Fearnley-Whittingstall (1965–), chef and food writer

 Neville Ford (1906–2000), cricketer
 Harold Freeman-Attwood (1897–1963), soldier
 Julian Grenfell (1888–1915), poet

 Field Marshal Lord Inge, Chief of the General Staff

 Monsignor Ronald Knox (1888–1957), theologian

Sir Christopher Lee (1922–2015), actor
 Harold Macmillan (1894–1986), Prime Minister
 Sir William Macpherson (1926–2021), judge and Chief of the Clan Macpherson
 Patrick Macnee (1922–2015), actor
 Henry Gwyn Jeffreys Moseley (1887–1915), physicist 
 Adam Nicolson (1957–), writer
 Sir Andrew Noble, 1st Baronet (1831–1915), physicist
 Victor Pasmore (1908–1998), artist and architect
 Sir James Pitman (1901–1985), inventor of the Initial Teaching Alphabet
 Archibald Wavell, 1st Earl Wavell (1883–1950), Viceroy of India

Notes

References

Sources
 Summerfields School Register 1864-1960, Oxonian Press 1960
 
 Nicholas Aldridge, Time to spare? A History of Summer Fields, 1989

External links
 Summerfields.com, official school website
 Profile on the Independent Schools Council website

Boys' schools in Oxfordshire
Educational institutions established in 1864
Schools in Oxford
Boarding schools in Oxfordshire
Preparatory schools in Oxfordshire
1864 establishments in England